Further is the seventh studio album by The Chemical Brothers, released on 14 June 2010. The album title and release date were announced on the band's official website on 30 March 2010. All 8 tracks from the album are accompanied by corresponding films, made specifically to match them, by Adam Smith and Marcus Lyall. The main character of the films is portrayed by actress Romola Garai. The woman on the album cover is aquatic athlete Jenny Godding, who also body doubled for the underwater portions of the music videos.

Background
The album, along with its visuals, was released as a bonus DVD on deluxe edition, as an iTunes LP, and as an iTunes Pass feature in US only.  As a part of the iTunes Pass program, those who purchased it received an unreleased track, named "Pourquoi", on 29 June 2010. The standard edition was released on CD, containing just the eight-track album.

Further is their first album not to feature any guest collaborations. Though there are no guest collaborations on the album in the traditional sense, Further features Stephanie Dosen on vocals and Bruce Woolley on theremin as session musicians. Tom Rowlands sang himself on certain tracks.

The album was the duo's first on Parlophone, ending fourteen years of releases on Virgin, although both labels are owned by EMI.

Although it charted in many other countries, the album was excluded from the UK charts because British chart regulations forbid prizes being used as enticements to buy albums, and all formats of Further included a competition to win an iPad.

In the United States, the album debuted at No. 63 on Billboard 200, No. 3 on Top Dance/Electronic Albums, and No. 15 on Top Rock Albums, selling 7,000 copies in its first week. The album has sold 40,000 copies in the United States as of June 2015.

Further was nominated for Best Electronic/Dance Album at the 2011 Grammy Awards, but lost to La Roux's self-titled debut album.

A number of its tracks were used in the media. The bonus track "Don't Think" was featured in the 2010 film Black Swan, in an altered form. The track "Dissolve" was featured as a playlist on the 2012 video game Lumines Electronic Symphony.  The track "Snow" was featured in the 2015 film American Ultra. The track "Swoon" was featured as interface music in the 2011 video game PES 2012.

Track listing

As with all other albums by The Chemical Brothers, many of the tracks segue into the next. "Swoon" and "Wonders of the Deep" are the only tracks on Further that end with silence.

Personnel
 The Chemical Brothers - production

Additional musicians
Bruce Woolley - theremin
Steve Dub  - mixing, engineering
Stephanie Dosen - additional vocals
Adam Smith - art direction
Tom Hingston Studio - design
Mike Marsh - mastering
Lawrence Aldridge - editing assistant
Jez Tozer - photography
Cheeky Paul - editing

Singles
 "Escape Velocity" was released on 12 April 2010 as a vinyl-only single. It did not chart in the UK charts.
 "Swoon" was released on 9 June 2010. It reached #85 in the UK charts.
 "Another World" was released as download on 16 August 2010.
 Also available as downloads are "Swoon" (Boys Noize Summer Remix), "Swoon" (Lindstrøm and Prins Thomas Remix) and "Horse Power" (Popof Remix).
 "Horse Power" was released in 2010 as a Promo DJ Single. It did not chart in the UK charts.

Charts

References

External links

The Chemical Brothers albums
2010 albums
Parlophone albums